Schönfelder or Schoenfelder is a German surname. People with the surname include:
Adolph Schönfelder (1875–1966), German politician 
Anke Schönfelder (born 1975), German gymnast
Erich Schönfelder (1885–1933), German screenwriter, actor, and film director
Friedrich Schoenfelder (1916–2011), German actor and voice artist
Helmut Schönfelder (1914–2003), German Luftwaffe pilot
Gerd Schönfelder (born 1970), German para-alpine skier
Karl-Heinz Schönfelder (born 1929), German historian of modern literature
Olivier Schoenfelder (born 1977), French ice dancer
Rainer Schönfelder (born 1977), Austrian former skier

German-language surnames
German toponymic surnames